Leptosiphon ciliatus (syn. Linanthus ciliatus) is a species of flowering plant in the phlox family known by the common name whiskerbrush.

Distribution
It is native to California, Baja California (México), Nevada, and Oregon, growing below  in elevation.

It is a common plant in many types of habitats, including chaparral, oak woodland, grassland, yellow pine forest, red fir forest, lodgepole forest, and subalpine forest.

Description
Leptosiphon ciliatus is a hairy annual herb producing a thin stem up to about 30 centimeters tall. The leaves are each divided into needle-like lobes up to 2 centimeters long, with leaf pairs appearing as a cluster of narrow lobes.

The tip of the stem has an inflorescence of one or more flowers each with a long, hairy tube up to 2.5 centimeters long emerging from the leaf-like sepals. The face of the flower is less than a centimeter wide and pale to bright pink with white and yellow coloring and reddish spots on the throat.  The bloom period is March to July, depending on altitude and latitude.

External links
Calflora Database: Leptosiphon ciliatus (Whiskerbrush)
Manual eFlora (TJM2) treatment of Leptosiphon ciliatus
UC CalPhotos gallery: Leptosiphon ciliatus

ciliatus
Flora of Baja California
Flora of California
Flora of Nevada
Flora of Oregon
Flora of the Cascade Range
Flora of the Klamath Mountains
Flora of the Sierra Nevada (United States)
Natural history of the California chaparral and woodlands
Natural history of the California Coast Ranges
Natural history of the Central Valley (California)
Natural history of the Channel Islands of California
Natural history of the Peninsular Ranges
Natural history of the San Francisco Bay Area
Natural history of the Santa Monica Mountains
Natural history of the Transverse Ranges
Flora without expected TNC conservation status